Étienne Fjord is a bay  long, lying between Bolsón Cove and Thomson Cove on the south side of Flandres Bay, along the west coast of Graham Land. It was charted by the French Antarctic Expedition, 1903–05, and named by Jean-Baptiste Charcot for Eugène Étienne (1844–1921), a French politician who was Vice President of the French Chamber of Deputies, 1902–04, and Minister of War, 1905–06.

Further reading 

 Eugene Domack, David Amblàs, Robert Gilbert, Stefanie Brachfeld, Angelo Camerlenghi, Michele Rebesco, Miquel Canals, and Roger Urgeles, Subglacial Morphology and Glacial Evolution of the Palmer Deep Outlet System, Antarctic Peninsula, Geomorphology

External links 

 Étienne Fjord on USGS website
 Étienne Fjord on USGS website] on AADC website] on SCAR website
 Étienne Fjord on marineregions.org

References 

Bays of Graham Land
Graham Coast